The Lude is an  long stream of Saxony-Anhalt, in the Harz Mountains of central Germany. It is the strongest and – besides an affluent of itself – longest headwater of the Thyra and therefore hydrographically defined as its upper course.

Course 
The Lude rises northwest of Stolberg, about one kilometre west of Breitenstein. From 1745 to 1910 the Rieschengraben ditch channelled water from the Lude and Schmale Lude into the Lower Harz Pond and Ditch System, where the water of the Lude was impounded by the reservoir . At the foot of the Lindischberg (orographic right) and Kießlingskopf (orographic left) hills the Klippenwasser empties into the upper Lude. Just 500 metres further downstream the Lude has another, right-hand tributary. The stream is considerably longer than the Hellbach, has a significantly greater catchment area, its own tributaries and is impounded in its lower reaches. The name of this stream is not known.

The Thyra is formed by the confluence of the three mountain streams of the Lude, Kleine Wilde and Große Wilde (whose upper three thirds are called the Schmale Lude = "Narrow Lude") in the old town area of Stolberg. The Thyra then continues through Stolberg flowing in a southerly direction.

See also 
List of rivers of Saxony-Anhalt

References 

Mansfeld-Südharz
Rivers of Saxony-Anhalt
Rivers of Germany